The agger nasi (from Latin: agger meaning "mound or heap") is a small ridge on the lateral side of the nasal cavity.  It is located midway at the anterior edge of the middle nasal concha, directly above the atrium of the middle meatus.  It is formed by a mucous membrane that is covering the ethmoidal crest of the maxilla.

It is also called the nasoturbinal concha and the nasal ridge. In 90% of patients an anterior ethmoidal cell (called the "agger nasi cell") can be found in the lacrimal bone below the agger nasi ridge. An enlarged agger nasi cell may encroach the frontal recess area, constricting it and causing mechanical obstruction to frontal sinus drainage.

References

Bibliography
"Agger nasi", Stedman's Medical Dictionary, 27th ed. (2000). 

Bones of the head and neck